Phnom Nam Lyr is a 1030 m basalt hill in eastern Mondulkiri province, close to the border with Vietnam. The site is sacred to the Bunong people. The rock is part of the Chhlong Plateau, a Quaternary period volcanic basaltic dome, that has been heavily eroded to form hills and valleys.

The site is being considered as a UNESCO Global Geopark. The site is a popular tourist attraction for tourists.

References 

Sacred mountains
Sacred rocks